Events from the year 1682 in art.

Events
 (unknown)

Works

 Thomas Cartwright - Statue of Edward VI (St Thomas' Hospital, London)
 Nicolas Colombel - Christ Expelling the Money-Changers from the Temple
 Luca Giordano - The Judgement of Paris (approximate date)
 Godfrey Kneller - Portrait of Anne, Duchess of Hamilton
 Claude Lorrain - Ascanius Shooting the Stag of Sylvia

Births 
February 13 – Giovanni Battista Piazzetta, Italian rococo painter (died 1754)
April 15 – Jan van Huysum, Dutch painter (died 1749)
May 27 - Bernard Lens III, English artist known primarily for his portrait miniatures (died 1740)
August 15 - Annibale Albani, Italian Cardinal, whose library, gallery of paintings/sculpture, and cabinet of coins were added to the Vatican collection (died 1751)
October 24 - William Aikman (painter), Scottish portrait-painter (died 1731)
date unknown
Giacomo Adolfi, Italian painter, active in and around Bergamo (died 1741)
Jacopo Amigoni, Italian painter known for mythological figures and religious artifacts, best known for his initial work in Venice (died 1752)
Mosen Vicente Bru, Spanish painter (died 1703)
Margareta Capsia, Finnish painter (died 1759)
Claude Du Bosc, French engraver (died 1745)
Jean Charles Flipart, French engraver (died 1751)
Girolamo Gatti, Italian painter (died 1726)
Gustavus Hesselius, Swedish-American painter (died 1755)
Hua Yan, Chinese painter from Fujian province (died 1756)
 Isabel Jolís Oliver, Spanish printer and engraver  (died 1770)
Giovanni Domenico Lombardi, Italian painter in Lucca (died 1751)
Kaspar Anton von Baroni-Cavalcabo, Italian painter (died 1759)
Alexey Zubov, Russian etcher (died 1741)
probable
Shen Quan, Chinese painter during the Qing Dynasty (died 1760)
John Wootton, English painter of sporting subjects, battle scenes and landscapes (died 1764)

Deaths
January 13 - Francesco Cozza, Italian painter (born 1605)
February 2 - Jean Le Pautre, French designer and engraver (born 1618)
March 14 - Jacob Isaakszoon van Ruisdael, celebrated Dutch landscape painter (born 1628)
April 3 - Bartolomé Esteban Murillo, Spanish painter (born 1617)
May 23 - Abraham Wuchters, Dutch-Danish painter and engraver (born 1608)
November 23 - Claude Lorrain, French landscape painter (born c.1600)
date unknown
Niccolò Berrettoni, Italian painter (born 1637)
Jacopo Baccarini, Italian painter of the Baroque period born in Reggio (born 1605)
Pieter Janssens Elinga, Dutch painter (born 1623)
Giacinto de Popoli, Italian painter active near his native city of Orta (b. unknown)
Urbano Romanelli, Italian painter in Rome and in churches at Velletri (born 1645)

 
Years of the 17th century in art
1680s in art